Following is a list of football clubs located in Palestine, sorted alphabetically.

West Bank
 Ahli Qalqilyah
 Al-Bireh Institute
 Hilal Al-Makdesi
 Hilal Al-Quds
 Hilal Areeha
 Jabal Al Mukaber
 Markaz Balata
 Markaz Shabab Al-Am'ari
 Markaz Shabab Askar
 Markaz Tulkarem
 Shabab Al-Bireh
 Shabab Al-Khaleel
 Shabab Al-Dhahrieh
 Surif Club
 Tarji Wadi Al-Nes
 Thaqafi Tulkarem
 Wadi Al-Neiss

Gaza
 Al-Ahli Gaza
 Al-Shejaia
 Khidmat Al-Shatia
 Khidmat Jabalia
 Khidmat Khan Younes
 Al-Hilal Gaza
 Al-Qadisiya
 Al-Sadaqah
 Shabab Rafah
 Al-Ahli Bait Hanoun
 Gaza Sports Club
 Khidmat Al-Nosirat
 Khidmat Rafah
 Shabab Jabalia
 Rajaa Ghaza

Palestine